Joseph-Thomas Duhamel (6 November 1841 – 5 June 1909) was a Canadian Roman Catholic priest and Archbishop of Ottawa.

Born in Contrecœur, Lower Canada, he was educated at St. Joseph's College, Ottawa, and ordained in 1863. He became Bishop of Ottawa in 1874 and Archbishop of Ottawa in 1886. In 1887, he became metropolitan of the ecclesiastical province of Ottawa. He was chancellor of the University of Ottawa.

References

External links
 

1841 births
1909 deaths
19th-century Roman Catholic archbishops in Canada
20th-century Roman Catholic archbishops in Canada
Roman Catholic archbishops of Ottawa–Cornwall